Laniquidar (INN) is a third generation P-glycoprotein inhibitor that underwent clinical studies for acute myeloid leukemia (AML) and myelodysplastic syndrome (MDS). It has been discontinued because of its low bioavailability and a high variability with how the patients responded to the drug.

Clinical Trials 
Laniquidar has been tested for its efficacy for treating refractory breast cancer together with docetaxel and paclitaxel. Phase 2 clinical trials began in September 2001 by the European Organization for Research and Treatment of Cancer (EORTC) which included 35 participants. These patients have not responded to prior chemotherapy treatments. The study ended in June 2002 but the results have not been reported.

Chemistry 
Laniquidar is a benzazepine. The chemical name for Laniquidar is methyl 11-(1-(4-quinolin-2-ylmethoxy)phenethyl)piperidin-4ylidene)-6,11-dihydro-5H-benzo[d]imidazo[1,2-a]azepine-3-carboxylate and its free base form has a chemical formula of C37H36N4O3 with a molecular weight of 584.720 g/mol.

Mechanism of Action 
Laniquidar is a highly selective P-Glycoprotein (P-gp) inhibitor that also has a high lipophilicity. P-gp is a mulit-drug resistant protein that causes the efflux of substrates such as chemotherapeutic drugs out of the cell. Laniquidar works to inhibit the efflux by causing a conformational change of P-gp. This hinders ATP hydrolysis and the substrate can not be positioned to leave the cell since the permeability of the cell membrane decreases.

References 

Experimental cancer drugs
Quinolines
Phenol ethers
Piperidines
Nitrogen heterocycles
Heterocyclic compounds with 3 rings